Paschal Lamb may refer to:

 Passover sacrifice (Korban Pesach), a Jewish animal sacrifice
 Lamb of God, a title for Jesus in Christianity
 Pascal Lamb (heraldry), a charge used in heraldry

See also
Sacrificial lamb, a metaphorical reference to a person or animal sacrificed for the common good